Proceedings of the Royal Entomological Society was a peer-reviewed scientific journal of entomology established in 1926 by the Royal Entomological Society. A history is presented below.

History
Ever the years, the journal was split and renamed several times:
Proceedings of the Royal Entomological Society (1926–1936)
Proceedings of the Royal Entomological Society, Series A (1936–1970)
Journal of Entomology, Series A (1971–1976)
Proceedings of the Royal Entomological Society, Series B (1936–1970)
Journal of Entomology, Series B (1971–1976)
Proceedings of the Royal Entomological Society, Series C (1936–1977)

After 1977, several journals continued the Proceedings, restarting volume numbering at 1.
Ecological Entomology (1976–present)
Physiological Entomology (1976–present)
Systematic Entomology (1976–present)

External links
Entomological Society website
Royal Entomological Society journals

Entomology journals and magazines
Publications established in 1926
Publications disestablished in 1976
Royal Entomological Society